Burning in Water, Drowning in Flame is the debut album of Skrew, released in 1992 through Metal Blade Records. Al Jourgensen, Paul Barker and Mike Scaccia of Ministry all feature as guests. The track "Poisonous" features rapping and hip hop turntables.

Track listing

Personnel 
Skrew
Chris Ault – keyboards, programming, production
Mark Dufour – drums
Adam Grossman – vocals, guitar, programming, design, production
Danny Lohner – vocals, guitar, programming, production
Mike Peoples – bass guitar
Mike Robinson – guitar
Production and additional personnel
Keith Auerbach – engineering
Tom Baker – mastering
Paul Barker – engineering
Charlemagne – choir
George Lewis – drums
John Herndon – percussion
Billy Jackson – additional vocals
Al Jourgensen – engineering, guitar
Jim Marcus – additional vocals
Tony Maingot – programming
Keith Mestl – engineering
Jeff Newell – engineering
Phil Owen – production, additional vocals
Mike Scaccia – guitar
Jessica Villines – engineering
Ricky Weir – programming
Jason Wolford – turntables

References

External links 
 

1992 debut albums
Metal Blade Records albums
Skrew albums